Johann Christian Friedrich Steudel (25 October 1779, in Esslingen am Neckar – 24 October 1837, in Tübingen) was a German Lutheran theologian. He was a brother of botanist Ernst Gottlieb von Steudel (1783–1856).

From 1797 he studied Protestant theology at the University of Tübingen. Beginning in 1803, he worked as a vicar in Oberesslingen, and two years later, became a tutor at Tübinger Stift. In 1808 he traveled to Paris, where he studied with Silvestre de Sacy and Carl Benedict Hase. Following his return to Germany, he served as a deacon in Cannstatt (from 1810) and Tübingen (from 1812). In 1815 he became an associate professor of theology at the University of Tübingen, where in 1822 he gained a full professorship. From 1826 onward, he was a professor of dogmatics and Old Testament theology at the university.

He was a proponent of rational supernaturalism, and was the last prominent member of the so-called "Old Tübingen School" of theology. During the latter part of his career, he spearheaded an attack on David Strauss's controversial book, Das Leben Jesu.

Selected works 
In 1828 he founded the journal Tübinger Zeitschrift für Theologie. The following are a few of Steudel's significant writings:
 Ueber die Haltbarkeit des Glaubens an geschichtliche, hohere Offenbarung Gottes, 1814 – On the durability of faith in an historical, higher revelation of God.
 Neuere Vorträge über Religion und Christenthum, 1825 – Newer lectures on religion and Christianity.
 Grundzüge einer Apologetik für das Christenthum, 1830 – Principles of apologetics for Christianity.
 Die Glaubenslehre der evangelisch-protestantischen Kirche, 1834 – The doctrine of the faith of the Evangelical-Protestant Church.
After his death, his lectures on Old Testament theology were published by Gustav Friedrich Oehler.

Further reading 
 Werner Raupp: Steudel, Johann Christian Friedrich, in: Neue Deutsche Biographie (NDB), Vol. 25. Berlin: Duncker & Humblot 2013, p. 309–310 (with genealogy and selected bibliography).

References 

1779 births
1837 deaths
People from Esslingen am Neckar
University of Tübingen alumni
Academic staff of the University of Tübingen
19th-century German Protestant theologians